The Songwe River is a river that forms the international boundary between Malawi and  Songwe Region, Tanzania. The songwe region in Tanzania is named after the river. 

The Songwe's headwaters are where the borders of Malawi, Tanzania, and Zambia meet. It flows southeast to empty into Lake Nyasa. The middle course separates Malawi's Misuku Hills from the Umalila Mountains in Songwe Region Tanzania. The lower course flows through the Kyela Plain, a fertile lowland lying northwest of Lake Malawi the valley of the East African Rift. The Kyela Plain is cultivated intensively with rice and other crops.

External links
Tanzania, Malawi to Implement Songwe River Basin Plan

References

Rivers of Malawi
Rivers of Tanzania
Malawi–Tanzania border
International rivers of Africa
Border rivers